The Dragon in the Sea (1956), also known as Under Pressure from its serialization, is a novel by Frank Herbert. It was first serialized in Astounding magazine from 1955 to 1956, then reworked and published as a standalone novel in 1956. A 1961 2nd printing of the Avon paperback, catalog # G-1092, was titled 21st Century Sub with the previous title in parentheses, and a short 36 page version of the novel was later collected in Eye. It is usually classified as a psychological novel.

Plot 
In a near-future earth, the West and the East have been at war for more than a decade, and resources are running thin.  The West is stealing oil from the East with specialized nuclear submarines ("subtugs") that sneak into the underwater oil fields of the East to secretly pump out the oil and bring it back.  Each carrying a crew of four, these submarines undertake the most hazardous, stressful missions conceivable, and of late, the missions have been failing, with the last twenty submarines simply disappearing.

The East has been very successful in planting sleepers in the West's military and command structures, and the suspicion is that sleepers are sabotaging the subs or revealing their positions once at sea.  John Ramsey, a young psychologist from the Bureau of Psychology (BuPsych), is trained as an electronics operator and sent on the next mission, replacing the previous officer who went insane.  His secret mission is to find the sleeper, or figure out why the crews are going insane.

Major themes 
Herbert's portrayal of submarines towing large bags filled with surreptitiously pumped oil has been cited as an inspiration for the invention called the Dracone, for which development started in the year following Herbert's serial.

Reception 
Galaxy reviewer Floyd C. Gale praised Dragon in the Sea as "a dramatically fascinating story. . . . [a] tense and well-written novel." Algis Budrys described it as "hypnotically fascinating," praising Herbert's "intelligence, sophistication, [and] capacity for research" as well as his "ability to write clean prose as an unobtrusive but effective vehicle for a cleanly told story." Anthony Boucher found the novel "as impressive in its cumulative depiction of a specialized scientific background as anything since Hal Clement's Mission of Gravity." Spider Robinson, reviewing a mid-1970s reissue, faulted the novel's characterizations, saying "there are no real people in it, only psychological types and syndromes walking around on legs."

J. Francis McComas praised the novel in The New York Times, comparing it to Forester and Wouk and declaring, "In this fine blend of speculation and action, Mr. Herbert has created a novel that ranks with the best of modern science fiction."

Awards 
The Dragon in the Sea tied for number thirty-four in the 1975 Locus All-Time Poll.

References

External links 
The "Under Pressure" chapter from Timothy O'Reilly's critical study of Frank Herbert, Frank Herbert
 Review
 

1956 American novels
American thriller novels
Novels by Frank Herbert
Works originally published in Analog Science Fiction and Fact
Novels first published in serial form
Doubleday (publisher) books
Submarines in fiction
Works about petroleum
Underwater novels